Iran and the Caucasus  is a biannual multidisciplinary peer-reviewed academic journal published by Brill Publishers in collaboration with the Caucasian Centre for Iranian Studies (Yerevan). The journal covers the history (ancient, mediaeval and modern), culture, anthropology, literature (textology), folklore, linguistics, archaeology, politics, and economy of the region. Articles are published in English, French and German. It was established in 1997 by Garnik Asatrian, the head of the Center. The editor-in-chief is Garnik Asatrian (Yerevan).

Abstracting and indexing 
The journal is abstracted and indexed in the Arts and Humanities Citation Index and the International Bibliography of the Social Sciences.

References

External links 
 

Iranian studies journals
Publications established in 1997
Multilingual journals
Brill Publishers academic journals
Biannual journals
Caucasology